G protein-coupled receptor 50 is a protein which in humans is encoded by the GPR50 gene.

Function 
GPR50 is a member of the G protein-coupled receptor family of integral membrane proteins and is most closely related to the melatonin receptor.  GPR50 is able to heterodimerize with both the MT1 and MT2 melatonin receptor subtypes.  While GPR50 has no effect on MT2 function, GPR50 prevented MT1 from both binding
melatonin and coupling to G proteins. GPR50 is the mammalian ortholog of melatonin receptor Mel1c described in non-mammalian vertebrates.

Clinical significance 
Certain polymorphisms of the GPR50 gene in females are associated with increased risk of developing bipolar affective disorder, major depressive disorder, and  schizophrenia. Other GPR50 gene polymorphism are associated with higher fasting circulating triglyceride levels and lower circulating High-density lipoprotein levels.

References

Further reading

G protein-coupled receptors